The Falls of Cruachan Railway Viaduct is a railway viaduct that carries the West Highland Line over the Falls of Cruachan, near Loch Awe.

History
The viaduct was engineered by John Strain, and is dated 1880. It was built for the Callander and Oban Railway.

It was listed as a Category A listed building in 2007. On 6 June 2010, the Falls of Cruachan derailment happened nearby, when a two-car diesel multiple unit derailed and caught fire after hitting a rock.

Design
The piers are made of bull-faced stone, and the arches from mass concrete, a material not previously employed on British railways. There is a parapet with a central crenelation, topped with a recent steel safety rail.

The viaduct spans the small gully created by the Falls of Cruachan, close to the entrance to the pumped-storage Cruachan Power Station, which is located in a chamber within Ben Cruachan. It is close to the Falls of Cruachan railway station, a request stop.

References

Railway bridges in Scotland
Listed bridges in Scotland
Category A listed buildings in Argyll and Bute
Bridges in Argyll and Bute
Bridges completed in 1880
1880 establishments in Scotland